PR-24 and PR24 may refer to:
 Side-handle baton, a baton with a short side handle at a right angle to the shaft, about six inches from one end
 Puerto Rico Highway 24, a road connecting the city of Cataño to Guaynabo
Cullingford Field